Novikovo is a rural locality (a selo) and the administrative center of Novikovsky Selsoviet, Biysky District, Altai Krai, Russia. The population was 1,157 as of 2013. There are 22 streets.

Geography 
Novikovo is located 59 km east of Biysk (the district's administrative centre) by road. Souskanikha is the nearest rural locality.

References 

Rural localities in Biysky District